The International Rescue Corps (IRC) is a volunteer organisation involved in disaster rescue, based in Grangemouth, Scotland.

Description
International Rescue Corps is an independent (i.e. non-governmental funded) United Nations registered disaster rescue service with an accredited UK National Open College Network qualification in Urban Search and Rescue. Being a charity, the IRC is supported entirely by donations from the public and sponsorship from industry. IRC members are unpaid volunteers and all the IRC's services are provided free of charge—the Corps' aim is purely to save life. The organisation is named after the fictional emergency-response organisation, International Rescue, in Gerry Anderson’s popular TV series, Thunderbirds.

History
The Corps was formed in 1981 in the aftermath of the 1980 Irpinia earthquake and became operational in 1985; it has since undertaken numerous missions at home and across the world. In many cases, missions are co-operative efforts working alongside other agencies both nationally and internationally.

Over the last 25 years IRC has undertaken a variety of work both in the UK and abroad. Overseas missions include several earthquakes, hurricanes and subsequent floods, mudslides and logistical / aid work, whilst UK missions include gas explosions, train crashes, highline rescues, missing person searches and floods.

Training and equipment
Volunteers come from all walks of life. Initially, the Corps tended to just attract members of the emergency services (police, fire and ambulance) but today they also include council workers, union representatives, management consultants, engineers and many others.

To carry out the Corps' role, operational members are required to satisfactorily complete a three-year training programme through the UK National Open College Network. Training consists of learning about earthquakes, specialist SAR (search and rescue) equipment, building construction, medical aid and casualty handling, boat handling, advanced rope skills, orienteering and map reading, helicopter coordination, Humanitarian Logistics and communications. Following the first year of training the member is able to participate in local and national missions in a support role; only after the full three years (with extensive assessments) will he/she be able to participate in overseas missions. They will then have one of the few recognised qualifications in Urban Search and Rescue in Europe.

Equipment taken by the team will vary according to the nature of the disaster. Principal items include thermal image cameras, sound detectors, fibre-optic probes, portable generators and lights, cutting equipment, tents, fifteen days' supply of food and water purification equipment, thus allowing the team to operate without imposing any additional strain on the host country. Satellite communication systems enables the Corps to provide a reconnaissance and co-ordination service for the United Nations (UN) and other agencies if requested.

See also
 Flood

References

Bibliography

External links
 International Rescue Corps

Charities based in Scotland
Rescue agencies
Organizations established in 1981